Georges Diran Garvarentz (1 April 1932 - 19 March 1993) was an Armenian-French composer, noted for his music for films and Charles Aznavour's songs.

Biography
Georges Garvarentz was born in Athens, Greece, to a family of Armenian immigrants. His father, literature professor and poet Kevork Garvarentz, was the author of the Armenian military anthem.

In 1942 Garvarentz's family moved to Paris, France, where Georges attended Conservatoire de Paris.

Career
In 1956 Georges met Charles Aznavour and started writing music for his songs. Together they wrote over 100 songs, including "Prends garde à toi" (1956), "Et pourtant" (1962), "Il faut saisir sa chance" (1962), "Retiens la nuit" (1962), "La plus belle pour aller danser" (1964), "Hier encore" (1964), "Paris au mois d'août" ("Paris in August", 1966), "Une vie d'amour" (1980).

The period from the latter half of the 1980s until Garvarentz’s death in 1993 represented one of the most productive and enduring periods of collaboration with Aznavour. Despite Charles then approaching 60 years of age and having already long been an established star with a repertoire of recognisable classics and hits, Garvarentz’s and Aznavour’s works of this epoch yielded a wave of more musically contemporary works that came to enjoy equal billing alongside Aznavour’s earlier successes: two albums’ worth of new songs composed by Garvarentz and written by Aznavour were recorded in 1986 and released as the albums «Aznavour 1986: Je bois» that same year and «Embrasse-moi» in 1987, which gave rise to numerous songs that would become staples of Aznavour’s concert performances for the rest of his career, including Je me raccroche à toi, Je bois, Les émigrants, Une idée, and others. This was followed in 1991 by the album «Aznavour 92» and its new songs Vous et tu, Napoli chante and La Marguerite. Their final new works of the era were on Aznavour’s 1994 album «Toi et moi» (released in 1995 in the anglophone world as «You and Me»); Garvarentz’s last collaboration with Aznavour, the song Ton doux visage, was released on this album.

In 1965 Georges married Charles Aznavour's sister, Aida Aznavourian.

Georges Garvarentz also composed over 150 film scores, including scores for Taxi for Tobruk (1961), Les Parisiennes (1962), The Devil and the Ten Commandments (1962), Le Rat d'Amérique (1963), That Man in Istanbul (1965), The Sultans (1966), The Sea Pirate (1966), Triple Cross (1966), The Peking Medallion (1967), Caroline chérie (1968), They Came to Rob Las Vegas (1968), The Southern Star (1969), The Heist (1970), Love Me Strangely (1971), Someone Behind the Door (1971), The Pebbles of Etratat (1972), Murder in a Blue World (1973), Killer Force (1976), Teheran 43 (1981), Hambone and Hillie (1983), The Triumphs of a Man Called Horse (1983), Too Scared to Scream (1985), Yiddish Connection (1986), A Star for Two (1991), and Catorce estaciones (1991)

In 1979 he wrote the score to The Golden Lady, and co-wrote the title song for The Three Degrees, together with lead singer Sheila Ferguson.

Garvarentz is the author of a musical comedy Deux anges sont venus and an operetta Douchka.

Awards and recognition 
 In 1964 Garvarentz was awarded a special prize by the Chansonnier society
 In 1989 Garvarentz has received a Gemini award for the Best Original Music Score - Program or Miniseries

References

External links 
"Pour toi Arménie" 
(fr) Georges Garvarentz et la musique de film, Daniel Bastié,Ed.Ménadès (2019) (IBNS : 978-2960226232)

Georges Garvarentz at Encyclopédisque 

French songwriters
Male songwriters
French people of Armenian descent
Greek people of Armenian descent
Greek emigrants to France
Musicians from Paris
1932 births
1993 deaths
20th-century French musicians
French operetta composers
French film score composers
French male film score composers
20th-century French male musicians
Musicians from Athens